The seventh cabinet of Ion I. C. Brătianu was the government of Romania from 21 June 1927 to 24 November 1927.

Ministers
The ministers of the cabinet were as follows:

President of the Council of Ministers:
Ion I. C. Brătianu (21 June - 24 November 1927)
Minister of the Interior: 
Ion Gh. Duca (22 June - 24 November 1927)
Minister of Foreign Affairs: 
Ion I. C. Brătianu (22 June - 6 July 1927)
Nicolae Titulescu (6 July - 24 November 1927)
Minister of Finance:
Vintilă I.C. Brătianu (22 June - 24 November 1927)
Minister of Justice:
Stelian Popescu (22 June - 24 November 1927)
Minister of War:
Gen. Paul Angelescu (22 June - 24 November 1927)
Minister of Public Works:
Ion Nistor (22 June - 24 November 1927)
Minister of Agriculture and Property:
Constantin Argetoianu (22 June - 24 November 1927)
Minister of Communications:
Constantin D. Dimitriu (22 June - 24 November 1927)
Minister of Industry and Commerce:
Ludovic Mrazec (22 June - 24 November 1927)
Minister of Public Instruction:
Constantin Angelescu (22 June - 24 November 1927)
Minister of Religious Affairs and the Arts:
Alexandru Lapedatu (22 June - 24 November 1927)
Minister of Public Health and Social Welfare:
Ion Inculeț (22 June - 24 November 1927)
Ministry of Labour, Social Insurance and Cooperation
Nicolae Lupu (22 June - 24 November 1927)

References

Cabinets of Romania
Cabinets established in 1927
Cabinets disestablished in 1927
1927 establishments in Romania
1927 disestablishments in Romania